This page is a timeline for when various municipalities, universities, and states in the United States have officially recognized Indigenous Peoples' Day.

Timeline

1977

The International Conference on Discrimination Against Indigenous Populations in the Americas, sponsored by the United Nations in Geneva, Switzerland, began to discuss replacing Columbus Day in the United States with a celebration to be known as Indigenous Peoples' Day.

1989

 South Dakota (celebrated as Native American Day)

1990

At the First Continental Conference on 500 Years of Indian Resistance in Quito, Ecuador, representatives of Indian groups throughout the Americas agreed that they would mark 1992, the 500th anniversary of the first of the voyages of Christopher Columbus, as a year to promote "continental unity" and "liberation."

1992

The city council of Berkeley, California, declared October 12 as a "Day of Solidarity with Indigenous People", and 1992 the "Year of Indigenous People". The city implemented related programs in schools, libraries, and museums. The city symbolically renamed Columbus Day as "Indigenous Peoples' Day" beginning in 1992 to protest the historical conquest of North America by Europeans, and to call attention to the losses suffered by the Native American peoples and their cultures through diseases, warfare, massacres, and forced assimilation.

1994
 Santa Cruz, California

2014

April

The city council of Minneapolis, Minnesota, officially voted to recognize Indigenous Peoples' Day along with Columbus Day.

Red Wing, Minnesota, replaced Columbus Day with Chief Red Wing Day to honor the city's namesake, Hupaha-duta, the Dakota leader known in English as "Red Wing".

October

The city council of Seattle, Washington, officially renamed Columbus Day to Indigenous Peoples' Day.

Bellingham, Washington passed an ordinance recognizing the second Monday of October as Coast Salish Day in honor of the indigenous peoples of the Salish Sea bioregion.

Minnesota State University, Mankato began celebrating Indigenous Peoples' Day in place of Columbus Day, following an official vote to establish this by the Minnesota State Student Association.

December

The city council of Grand Rapids, Minnesota, passed a resolution recognizing Indigenous Peoples' Day.

2015

 Alpena, Michigan
 Bellingham, Washington
 Bexar County, Texas
 Corvallis, Oregon
 Fargo, North Dakota
 Grand Marais and Cook County, Minnesota
 Hillsborough, North Carolina

February

The City Commission of Traverse City, Michigan, passed a resolution recognizing Indigenous Peoples’ Day.

May

The Town of Newstead and the Village of Akron, New York, and the Akron Central School District, voted to celebrate Indigenous People's Day on Columbus Day.

August

The City Council of St. Paul, Minnesota, unanimously passed a resolution recognizing Indigenous Peoples’ Day in place of Columbus Day.

The City of Olympia, Washington, officially declared the second Monday of October as Indigenous Peoples’ Day to honor the area’s Native American heritage.

September

The Town and Village of Lewiston, New York, declared the second Monday of October, Indigenous Peoples' Day, on September 28 and October 5, 2015, respectively.

The Mayor of the City of Anadarko, Oklahoma signed the Indigenous Peoples’ Day proclamation, while surrounded by members and tribal leaders from the Apache, Choctaw, Delaware, Wichita and Affiliated Tribes, recognizing the second Monday in October as Indigenous Peoples’ Day.

October

The cities of Anchorage, Alaska; Portland, Oregon; Carrboro, North Carolina; and Albuquerque, New Mexico adopted similar resolutions.

Governor Bill Walker of Alaska issued an executive proclamation renaming Columbus Day "Indigenous Peoples' Day."

The city of San Fernando, California, passed a resolution recognizing Indigenous Peoples' Day. The City of San Fernando may be the first city in Los Angeles County to recognize this day.

December

On December 15, the City Council of Belfast, Maine approved the renaming of Columbus Day as Indigenous Peoples' Day.

2016

 Ann Arbor, Michigan
 Beaverton, Oregon
 Bozeman, Montana
 Ferndale, Michigan 
 Lawrence, Kansas
 Madison, Wisconsin
 Minnesota
 Syracuse University
 University of Central Oklahoma
 Ypsilanti, Michigan
 Winona State University, Minnesota

January

The City Council of Durango, Colorado unanimously voted to celebrate Indigenous Peoples' Day on the second Monday of October.

The Mayor and City Council of Asheville, North Carolina voted unanimously to adopt Indigenous Peoples' Day.

The student body of the University of Utah voted unanimously to support the replacement of the annual "Columbus Day" holiday to "Indigenous Peoples' Day".

February

The faculty of Brown University voted to designate the second Monday of October as "Indigenous Peoples' Day".

March

The City Council of Eugene, Oregon voted unanimously to approve a resolution declaring the second Monday of October as Indigenous Peoples’ Day.

June

The City of Cambridge, Massachusetts voted unanimously (9-0) to rename Columbus Day to Indigenous Peoples' Day. The Massachusetts communities of Amherst and Northampton, by the time early October 2016 arrived, had joined Cambridge in similarly re-naming the early October date.

August

The City of Boulder, Colorado voted unanimously (9-0) to establish Indigenous Peoples' Day.

The City of Spokane, Washington approved the establishment of Indigenous Peoples Day by a 6 to 1 vote.

September

The City Council of Bainbridge Island, Washington unanimously approved a resolution declaring the second Monday in October as Indigenous Peoples' Day.

The East Lansing, Michigan city council voted unanimously without discussion to declare the second Monday in October Indigenous Peoples' Day.

The Council of Santa Fe, New Mexico unanimously (8-0) approved a resolution declaring the second Monday in October, or what traditionally is Columbus Day, as Indigenous Peoples' Day in Santa Fe.

October

The Denver City Council unanimously (12-0) approved a resolution permanently recognizing Indigenous Peoples' Day on the second Monday of October.

The City Council of Yakima, Washington voted 5 to 2 to change Columbus Day to Indigenous Peoples' Day.

The City Council of Phoenix, Arizona voted unanimously (9-0) to recognize Indigenous Peoples' Day annually on Columbus Day. It was the largest US city to take such action.

Vermont Governor Peter Shumlin signed a proclamation declaring that October 10, 2016 will be observed as Indigenous People's Day in the state. The statement also acknowledges that the state was founded and built upon lands first inhabited by indigenous peoples.

Mayor Gregory F. Vaughn of Harpers Ferry, West Virginia signed a proclamation introduced to the Town Council by Recorder Kevin Carden declaring that day, and the second Monday of each subsequent October, to be called Indigenous Peoples' Day in the town.

2017

 Bar Harbor, Maine
Brookline, Massachusetts
 Charlottesville, Virginia
 Cornell University
 Davenport, Iowa
 Durham, New Hampshire
 Eau Claire, Wisconsin
 Falls Church, Virginia
 Graceland University
 Ithaca, New York
Kalamazoo, Michigan
 Kansas City, Missouri
 Long Beach, California 
 Los Angeles County, California
 Moscow, Idaho
 Nashville, Tennessee
 Newark, New Jersey
 Norman, Oklahoma
 Oak Park, Illinois
 Stanford, Kentucky
 Tahlequah, Oklahoma
 Trinidad and Tobago
 Tulsa, Oklahoma
 University of Alaska Fairbanks
 Watsonville, California

March
At a town meeting in Starks, Maine, an Indigenous Peoples' Day proposal was approved, 32-2, replacing Columbus Day observances.

August
On August 21, Oberlin, Ohio officially approved the change to Indigenous Peoples' Day.

One week later, on August 28, Bangor, Maine made it official as well.

As of August 30, the Los Angeles City Council authorized the celebration of Indigenous Peoples' Day in place of Columbus Day.

September
 On September 11, Orono became the third city in Maine to adopt Indigenous Peoples' Day.
 On September 18, both Brunswick and Portland in Maine adopted the change to Indigenous Peoples Day.

October

 On October 3, Iowa City Mayor Jim Throgmorton signed a proclamation adopting the change to Indigenous People's Day followed by the Johnson County, Iowa, Board of Supervisors on October 5.
On October 5, the Austin City Council adopted the change to Indigenous Peoples' Day.
 On October 9, the Eau Claire School Board (the eighth largest school district in Wisconsin) adopted the change to Indigenous Peoples Day.
 On October 9, the Cities of Salt Lake City, Utah, Burbank, California, and San Luis Obispo, California officially celebrated and adopted Indigenous Peoples' Day.
 The city of Aspen, Colorado followed Denver and Boulder in conferring recognition of Indigenous Peoples' Day.

2018

 Akron, Ohio (as North American First People's Day on the first Monday of October)
 Berea, Kentucky
 Boise, Idaho
 Brodhead, Kentucky
 Burnside, Kentucky
 Cincinnati, Ohio
 Corbin, Kentucky
 Corpus Christi, Texas
 Crab Orchard, Kentucky
 Drake University
 Frankfort, Kentucky
 Gouldsboro, Maine
 Harrodsburg, Kentucky
 Helena, Montana
 Hopkinsville, Kentucky
Iowa
 Junction City, Kentucky
 Lancaster, Kentucky
 Lawton, Oklahoma
 Liberty, Kentucky
 Livingston, Kentucky
 London, Kentucky
 Louisville, Kentucky
 Mankato, Minnesota
 Mt. Vernon, Kentucky
 North Carolina
 Oklahoma City, Oklahoma
 Okmulgee, Oklahoma
 Perryville, Kentucky
 Pittsfield, Massachusetts
 Prestonsburg, Kentucky
 Pullman, Washington
 Richmond, Kentucky
 Rochester, New York
 Russell Springs, Kentucky
 San Francisco, California
 Science Hill, Kentucky
 Somerset, Kentucky
 South Fulton, Georgia
 Southfield, Michigan
 Springfield, Kentucky
 Tacoma, Washington
 Taylorsville, Kentucky
 University of New Mexico

January

 A House Bill was introduced in the legislature of the State of New Hampshire that would rename Columbus Day to Indigenous Peoples' Day statewide.

February
School board officials in Southampton, New York voted to replace Columbus Day with Indigenous Peoples' Day on all school calendars.

July
Tompkins County, New York officials voted to recognize Indigenous Peoples' Day, in addition to Columbus Day.

September
 The mayor of the city of Somerville, Massachusetts announced that the city will observe Indigenous Peoples' Day rather than Columbus Day.

October
 The City Council of Flagstaff, Arizona unanimously passed a resolution which renamed Columbus Day to Indigenous Peoples' Day in addition to committing city resources to combating racism against Native Americans.

2019

Bloomington, Indiana
California 
Dallas, Texas
Davis, California
District of Columbia
Grand Forks, North Dakota
Great Barrington, Massachusetts
Hopkinton, New Hampshire
Keene, New Hampshire
Keene State College
Lasell University
Louisiana
Maine
Marathon County, Wisconsin
Marblehead, Massachusetts
Mashpee, Massachusetts
Michigan
Moorhead, Minnesota
New Mexico
Princeton, New Jersey
Provincetown, Massachusetts
Reno, Nevada
South Lake Tahoe, California
Takoma Park, Maryland
Wisconsin
Wichita, Kansas

September

The Ventura County, California Board of Supervisors voted unanimously to observe Indigenous Peoples' Day in place of Columbus Day.

2020

 Baltimore, Maryland
Colorado Springs, Colorado
Dover, New Hampshire
Exeter, New Hampshire
 The Columbus City Council of Columbus, Ohio set October 12 as Indigenous Peoples' Day, after removing Columbus Day as a holiday in 2018.
 Gig Harbor, Washington
 Harris County, Texas
 Houston, Texas
 Mansfield, Connecticut
 Nashua, New Hampshire
 Norristown, Pennsylvania
 Salem, Massachusetts
 Salisbury, Maryland
 Virginia

2021

Arlington, Massachusetts
Bedford, Massachusetts
Belmont, Massachusetts
 Boston, Massachusetts
Easthampton, Massachusetts
East Lyme, Connecticut (Columbus Day still recognized)
Falmouth, Massachusetts
Hartford, Connecticut
Holyoke, Massachusetts
Inyo County, California
Maynard, Massachusetts
Melrose, Massachusetts
Newton, Massachusetts
 Oregon
Philadelphia, PA
 Tempe, Arizona
 Texas
 United States (federal government), by President Joe Biden. by signing a presidential proclamation declaring October 11, 2021 to be a national holiday.
Wellesley, Massachusetts
West Lafayette, Indiana

Notes

References

Indigenous rights in the United States
Indigenous Peoples' Day
Indigenous Peoples' Day